Hamyar is a sub-district located in Al Qafr District, Ibb Governorate, Yemen. Hamyar had a population of  8301 as of 2004.

References 

Sub-districts in Al Qafr District